Daniel Katz (born 1938 in Helsinki) is a  Finnish writer.

He is a graduate of the University of Helsinki in the Humanities.  He worked as a Jewish history teacher at the Jewish School in Helsinki, and in Haifa Israel as a driller on subway construction.

He writes in Finnish. His first commercially successful novel, Kun isoisä Suomeen hiihti (When Grandfather Skied to Finland), is a humorous description of Katz's family history and Finland's entry into World War II. As an ethnic minority writer, Katz has written as an outsider regarding life in Finland. He has been awarded and been a finalist for the J. H. Erkko Award (debut novel), Runeberg Prize and others.

Katz has four children, including Dunja Katz and the musician Kalle Katz. He lives in Loviisa, Finland.

Works
Novels
Kun isoisä Suomeen hiihti, (When Grandfather Skied to Finland) WSOY 1969
Mikko Papirossin taivaallinen niskalenkki, WSOY 1972
Orvar Kleinin kuolema, WSOY 1976
Laturi, (The Blaster) WSOY 1979
Peltisepän päivällinen, WSOY 1981
Satavuotias muna, novelleja, WSOY 1983
Antti Keplerin lait, WSOY 1987
Naisen torso, novelleja, WSOY 1989
Saksalainen sikakoira, (German Pig-Dog) WSOY 1992
Otelo, novelleja, WSOY 1994
Herra Lootin tyttäret, WSOY 1999
Laituri matkalla mereen, (A Pier on the Way) WSOY 2001
Berberileijonan rakkaus (Berber Lion) WSOY 2008

Radio Plays 
Sankarikornetti, 1968
Perimmäisten ominaisuuksien äärellä eli Konrad Monomaani, 1971
Vappu, 1973

Screen plays 
Miten kalat suutelevat, 1970
Silleri karkuteillä, 1973
Orvar Kleinin laillinen ruumis (TV), 1975
Iso viulu – kaks' sataa (TV), 1976
sepeli metsä 1980
Kolmipäinen buddha eli valtapeli, 1978
Narrit (yhdessä Pekka Milonoffin kanssa), 1977
Jussi laidastalaitaan ja Pedro Papumaha, 1983
Säätieteilijä, 1983

References

Touko Kauppinen, Jokainen päivä alkaa epäillen. Syntymäpäivähaastattelu. Helsingin Sanomat 25.11.2008 s. C7

External links

Books from Finland 4/2008
Books from Finland 1/2002
WSOY Author page

Finnish Jews
Finnish male novelists
Finnish-language writers
Jewish writers
1938 births
Living people
20th-century Finnish novelists
21st-century Finnish novelists
20th-century male writers
21st-century male writers